The Ultimate Live Experience was a European concert tour that was mostly in the United Kingdom that was through the month of March 1995. This tour was to promote the soon-to-be The Gold Experience that was released in September later than year. Much of the setlist was from Gold Experience and there was also Come and Exodus material. However, he did say that he wouldn't not perform his Prince stuff from 1978 to early 1993. However, he did perform "I Love U in Me" and "7" with some covers.

An extension of the tour known as the Gold Tour was launched in 1996. The concerts featured mainly songs from the album, but also started adding prior Prince fan favorites.

History
The Ultimate Live Experience was performed during a chaotic period in Prince's life and career. He had much new music written but then record company Warner Brothers refused to release it at the speed that Prince wished, leading to public feuding. Meanwhile, Prince had already released the album Come with no promotion and was trying to get The Gold Experience released as well. During this time, he made many configurations of the album and this tour presents songs that he likely planned for the album (though not all would make the cut), as well as very rarely played cuts from the Prince period, with the exception of "7".

While the previous year's Ultimate Live Experience tour presented Gold Experience prior to its release, the long overdue album had finally hit shelves in late 1995 and this tour was now a "proper" promotion.  However, by this time, Prince had been playing some of the material for nearly two years and many of the songs were shortened to brief medleys.  Conversely, Prince had formerly said he would not play "Prince" material anymore, but that idea was apparently tossed to the wind with this tour.  Several fan-favorites such as "The Cross", "Do Me, Baby", and "Sexy MF" were regulars, along with the Gold material.  Also, Prince started performing a cover of Joan Osborne's "One of Us", which he would include on his next album, Emancipation.

Setlists
Setlist of March 3, 1995, at the Wembley Arena, London, England 

 "Endorphinmachine"
 "The Jam" (Includes "The Exodus Has Begun" lyric interpolation)
 "Shhh"
 "Days of Wild" (Includes snippets of "Hair")
 "Now" (Includes snippets of "Babies Makin' Babies")
 "Get Up (I Feel Like Being a) Sex Machine"
 "Johnny"
 "The Most Beautiful Girl in the World"
 "P. Control"
 "Letitgo"
 "Pink Cashmere"
 "(Lemme See Your Body) Get Loose!" (Unreleased remix of "Loose!")
 "I Love U in Me"
 "Proud Mary" (Includes "I Can't Turn You Loose" interpolation)
 Oriental prelude
 "7"
 "Dolphin"

Encore 

 "Get Wild"
 "Race"
 "Super Hero"
 Medley
 "Billy Jack Bitch"
 "Eye Hate U"
 "319"
 "Gold"

Tour dates

References

Prince (musician) concert tours
1995 concert tours
1996 concert tours